Since Ukraine's independence in 1991, the country has used four main systems of vehicle registration plates.

The first system was introduced in 1992 and was based on the last Soviet license plate conception, regulated by the 1977 standard, but with the addition of a new regional suffix corresponding to a Ukrainian province.

In 1993, the left-hand side of the plate was modified with the addition of the national flag over the country code "UA".

1995 saw the introduction of a completely new system consisting of five digits, with a dash between the third and fourth digit, combined with a two letter suffix. It also included a two-digit region code, situated under the National Flag on the left-hand side of the plate.

In order to enable drivers using their vehicle abroad, and in order to adhere to the Vienna Convention on Road Traffic, Ukrainian regular license plates use only those Cyrillic characters where the glyph resembles a letter from the Roman alphabet; a total of 12 characters: А, В, Е, І, К, М, Н, О, Р, С, Т, Х). Before 1995, the "Я" character was also used. For some types of black-background plates can be used completely Cyrillic characters.

Some vehicles, like trolleybuses, are not required to have license plates, because they cannot leave the network they operate on and can be identified by a number painted on the vehicle and assigned to it by the local public transport authority.

Previous series 

Between 1977 and 1993, Ukrainian registration plates were manufactured in accordance with the Soviet GOST 3207-77 standard. The alphanumeric sequence took the form of: x #### XX, where x is a lowercase Cyrillic serial/counter letter; # is any digit in the range 0-9; and XX are two uppercase Cyrillic letters indicating where the vehicle was first registered.

OK, OH, OC and OX used on registered vehicles driven in foreign countries.

Region identifiers

Current 2015 plates 

Current plates include a two-letter regional prefix followed by 4 digits then a two-letter serial suffix.

The international vehicle registration code UA is situated in the national-flag-colored band, which also includes the coat of arms, all on the left-hand side of the plate.

The size for the single line license plate is 520 mm by 112 mm.

Two-line optimized by size license plate must be shaped to fit to montage place and could have length 220-400 mm and height 110-320 mm.

The size for three-line motorcycle license plates are 220 mm by 174 mm.

The size for the two-line scooter license plate is 140 mm by 114 mm.

Issuing of regular plates is done in Latin alphabet order (AA, AB, AC, AE, AH, AI, AK, AM, AO, AP, AT, AX, BA, BB...).

License plates for trailers look like a regular plate but with a suffix with leading "X" and these are issued in reverse order (XX, XT, XP, XO...).

License plate codes

Vanity plates 
According to a 2007 decree, 2004 standard regular plates for private automobiles with triple leading zero combinations or combinations with all identical digits (except prohibited quadruple zero) are recognized as cherished and officially cost from 7,500 to 20,000 UAH (approx. 240 to 640 €). Plate owner can choose any yet not assigned suffix within a region of vehicle registration. All other combinations are officially recognized as an ordinary, but virtually known that some of so-called "pretty" combinations were purchased.

Recognition / collisions 

By the order of characters current plates completely repeat current Bulgarian and former, but still valid, Spanish systems. Because of this some plates may not be quickly recognized by nationality. This applies to the four regions of Spain with prefixes BA, BI, CA, IB; and mostly to the five regions of Bulgaria with prefixes BT, BH, CA, CB (Sofia again), CH, KH.

Macedonia also has BT (Bitola) and the same format (BT-9999-XX).

Former Albania registration system had BC, BC-9999-XX.

Individualized (vanity) license plates 

Individualized license plates are an additional type of plate, available for personal vehicles and motorcycles. State automobile inspection requires a previous vehicle registration with issuing of regular plates before issuing individualized plates. Using both plate-sets at the same time is prohibited, as well as driving abroad with the individualized license plates.

Individualized plates were first introduced in 1997 and included the numeric code of region. From 2004 have been issued plates with no region coding. Current (2007) individualized plates visually replicate the 1997 plates.

Plate-owners can choose Cyrillic or Roman letters for creation of individualized plates followed by some digits. In addition to the characters, plate owners can choose any image to print on the right-hand side of the plate. As far as it is known, this option is only available in Ukraine, so Ukrainian individualized plates are unique in this sense.

Prohibited to use any discriminatory or offensive phrases; any national, language, religious or gender self-identification; repeating the names and logos of official state's authorities; repeating the names and logos of foreign states and official foreign states' authorities etc.

Regional codes

After introducing the current system, regions' numeric codes were used in some non-regular plates (white-on-red temporary, white-on-blue ministry of internal affairs plates and black-on white personalized plates).

Special plates

Diplomatic plates
Current diplomatic plates is black-on-white, all combinations starts with "D"-prefix followed by six digits. Three-digit group following "D"-prefix is the code that indicates: in interval 001-199 - embassies by countries, 200-299 - international organizations, 300-399 - consular authority by countries. Last three digits is the serial number. Unofficially issues two-line optimize shaped diplomatic license plates.

Former diplomatic plates is still valid. White-on-red plates consists|smaller font three-digit code (001-100), prefix (CDP for ambassadors, DP for embassy personnel, CC for consular corps, S for staff) and four or five serial digits. Earliest white-on-red diplomatic plates (1995) scheme included the same letter prefixes and four-six digits (depending from number|letters), where the first three was a country code.

There were the same scheme black-on-yellow plates for non-diplomatic purposes (F or IT prefix for foreign companies). Earliest black-on-yellow (1995) scheme included prefix followed by six digits (F for foreign companies, C for foreigners, B for permanent export). In F-plates first three digits was a country code, in B and C-plates - a region code (from 649 to 673).

After 2004 non-diplomatic plates isn't necessary, but still valid.

Military and police plates

Military plates were white-on-black, while police plates were white-on-blue. Volunteer military organization plates were colored white-on-dark green.

Temporary series
Currently three main temporary plate types exists:

1) Dealers issues trade plate with non-regional prefix in interval T0-T9. There three shapes of this plates: a) for cars, trucks, buses, trailers; b) for motorcycles; c) for mopeds.

2) Inter-district registration and examination departments (MREV) issues temporary plates with regional coded prefix (01-27) if the vehicle needs re-registration in another region or country. There three shapes of this plates: a) for cars, trucks, buses, trailers; b) for motorcycles; c) for mopeds.

3) Special authorities issues temporary plates for an agricultural and self-propelled construction equipment with TP-prefix in "moped" shape.

All of these plates were white-on-red.

Diplomatic codes

See also
Vehicle registration plate
Vehicle registration plates of Europe

References

External links

Full Ukrainian region collection (2004)
Partly obsolete DSTU (in Ukrainian)
SAI official information about individualized license plates
Detailed information and history

Ukraine
Road transport in Ukraine
Ukraine transport-related lists
 Registration plates